Mehrdād is a common Persian male given name in Iran and other Persian speaking countries. The name is derived from Mehr, an angelic Zoroastrian divinity (yazata) of covenant, light, and oath. The Persian word mehr (مهر) also means "sun" or "love", while dād (داد) means "given". So, the literal meaning of Mehrdād (مهرداد) is "given by sun" or "given by love".
Mehrdad is a historical Persian name that derives from Middle Persian Mihrdāt (Old Persian Miθradāta), a theophoric name meaning 'given by Mehr'.

In modern-day Iran, the name Mehrdad is also retroactively applied to several historic Persian figures that appear in western literature as Mithridates, a Hellenized or philhellenic form of Mehrdad.

People
 Mehrdad Pahlbod (1917–2018), Iranian politician
 Mehrdad Kia, historian

References
 

Given names
Persian masculine given names